E. W. Bedford (21 December 1892 – 1972) was a British-born Ceylon tea planter.

Bedford was born on 21 December 1892 at Forest Gate, Essex (now in London), England. He came to Ceylon to join the tea plantation at Kandaloya, Dolosbage, where he was Assistant Superintendent from 1917 until 1923. He was commissioned as an officer to the British Army Indian Army Reserve at Bangalore from 15 January 1918 until 27 May 1918 at the War History Training School. He was later attached to the 3rd Sappers and Miners in Khyber Pass on 26 June 1919.

After his time in the army, he returned to Kandaloya to continue his work as a planter. From 1920 to 1930 he was the owner and manager of Tebuwatte Estate; while he was there he also looked after Oonankande Estate in Dolosbage. After the 1930 sale of Tebuwatte, he managed Oonankanda, adding to it with the 1949 purchase of Gangawaraliya & Hyderabad Estates. He continued managing both estates until 1953.

Bedford was also part of the World Amateur Ham Radio Association, and actively participated as an amateur radio operator. He was appointed Justice of Peace and unofficial Magistrate for Kegalle District in the 1950s. Bedford died in 1972, prior to his death he marked his own grave in Gangawaraliya Estate. After his death, Gangawaraliaya was transferred to his children.

Estates managed and owned by Bedford

References

Planters of British Ceylon
1892 births
1972 deaths
People from Forest Gate
British people in British Ceylon
Amateur radio people